The 1994 United States Senate Election in Maryland was held November 8, 1994. Incumbent Democratic Senator Paul Sarbanes won re-election to a fourth term.

Major candidates

Democratic 
 Paul Sarbanes, incumbent U.S. Senator

Republican 
 Bill Brock, former U.S. Secretary of Labor and former U.S. Senator from Tennessee

Polling

Results

Results by county

Counties that flipped from Democrat to Republican
Anne Arundel
Caroline
Garrett
Queen Anne's
Talbot

See also
1994 United States Senate elections
1994 United States elections

References

Notes

1994
Maryland
United States Senate